Harry Jindrich Benda (b. October 28, 1919, Liberec, Czechoslovakia; d. October 26, 1971 New Haven, Conn.) was a full professor at Yale University. He specialised in Indonesian politics.

Born to a Jewish family in former Czechoslovakia, he was sent to Java by his father to escape Nazism. He was the first director of the Institute for Southeast Asian Studies in Singapore.

The Association for Asian Studies' prize for first book in Southeast Asian studies is named in his honour.

Books
Benda, Harry J. The Crescent and the Rising Sun: Indonesian Islam Under the Japanese Occupation, 1942–1945. Dordrecht [etc.: Foris Publications, 1983. .'
Benda, Harry J. Japanese Military Administration in Indonesia. New Haven: Yale University Southeast Studies, 1965 
Benda, Harry J, and John A. Larkin. The World of Southeast Asia: Selected Historical Readings. New York: Harper & Row, 1967 
Benda, Harry J, and Ruth T. McVey. The Communist Uprisings of 1926-1927 in Indonesia: Key Documents. Jakarta: Equinox Pub, 2009. 
Bastin, John, and Harry J. Benda. A History of Modern Southeast Asia: Colonialism, Nationalism, and Decolonization. Sydney  : Prentice-Hall of Australia, 1977. 
Benda, Harry J. Peasant Movements in Colonial Southeast Asia. New Haven, Conn: Yale University, Southeast Asia Studies, 1966.
Benda, Harry J, and Adrienne Suddard. Continuity and Change in Southeast Asia: Collected Journal Articles of Harry J. Benda. New Haven: Yale Univ. Southeast Asia Studies, 1972
Benda, Harry J. Continuity and Change in Indonesian Islam. New Haven, Conn: Yale University, Southeast Asia Studies, 1965
translated into Indonesian by Taufik Abdullah. as Islam Di Indonesia: Sepintas Lalu Tentang Beberapa Segi. Jakarta: Tintamas, 1974. 
McVey, Ruth T, Adrienne Suddard, and Harry J. Benda. Southeast Asian Transitions: Approaches Through Social History. New Haven: Yale University Press, 1978. 
Benda, Harry J. The Samin Movement. New Haven: Connecticut, 1969

Further reading
 Andreas W. Daum, "Refugees from Nazi Germany as Historians: Origins and Migrations, Interests and Identities", in Andreas W. Daum, Hartmut Lehmann, James J. Sheehan, eds., The Second Generation: Émigrés from Nazi Germany as Historians. With a Biobibliographic Guide. New York: Berghahn Books, 2016 , 1‒52.

References

1919 births
1971 deaths
People from Prague
Yale University faculty
Nationality missing
Czechoslovak Jews
People of Czech-Jewish descent
Expatriates in the Dutch East Indies
Expatriates in Singapore
Czechoslovak emigrants to the United States